The Three Codonas is a 1940 German drama film directed by Arthur Maria Rabenalt and starring René Deltgen, Ernst von Klipstein and Josef Sieber. It is based on the life of the circus performer Alfredo Codona. It was made by Tobis Film, one of the largest German production companies. The film's sets were designed by the art director Emil Hasler. It premiered in Hamburg, twelve days before its first Berlin screening at the UFA-Palast am Zoo.

Cast

References

Bibliography 
 Klaus, Ulrich J. Deutsche Tonfilme: Jahrgang 1940. Klaus-Archiv, 1988.

External links

1940s biographical drama films
German biographical drama films
Films of Nazi Germany
Films directed by Arthur Maria Rabenalt
Circus films
Tobis Film films
Films set in New York City
Films set in the 1910s
German black-and-white films
1940 drama films
1940s German-language films
1940s German films